IL-15 can refer to:
Interleukin 15, a protein important in immunology
Illinois's 15th congressional district
Illinois Route 15